is a feminine Japanese given name.

Possible Writings

Yumika can be written using different kanji characters and can mean:

弓香, "bow, fragrance"
有美香,"exist, beauty, fragrance"
由美香, "reason/cause, beauty, fragrance"
結実華, "fruition, beautiful"
夕実華, "evening, fruit, beautiful"
優美佳, "tenderness, beauty, good"
悠美佳, "permanence, beauty, good"
祐美花, "help, beauty, flower"
由実花, "reason/cause, fruit, flower"
有美加, "exist/possess, beauty, add"
友美加, "friend, beauty, add"
裕美嘉, "rich, beauty, praise"
勇美嘉, "brave, beauty, praise"
The name can also be written in hiragana or katakana.

People 
Yumika Hayashi (由美香),  a Japanese AV idol and pink film actress
Yumika Tajima (ゆみか), a Japanese actress
Yumika Kiya (ゆみか), a Japanese actress, talent, and model

References 

Japanese feminine given names